Nyctimystes obsoletus, the Simbang big-eyed tree frog, is a species of frog in the subfamily Pelodryadinae, endemic to Papua New Guinea. Its natural habitats are subtropical or tropical moist lowland forests and rivers.

References

obsoletus
Amphibians of Papua New Guinea
Endemic fauna of Papua New Guinea
Amphibians described in 1900
Taxa named by Einar Lönnberg
Taxonomy articles created by Polbot